The 2008 Eisenhower Trophy took place 16–19 October at Royal Adelaide Golf Club and on the West course at The Grange Golf Club in Adelaide, Australia. It was the 26th World Amateur Team Championship for the Eisenhower Trophy and the second to be held in Australia. The tournament was a 72-hole stroke play team event with 65 three-man teams. The best two scores for each round counted towards the team total. Each team played two rounds on the two courses. The leading teams played at The Grange Golf Club on the third day and at Royal Adelaide Golf Club on the final day.

Scotland won their first Eisenhower Trophy, nine strokes ahead of the United States, who took the silver medal. Sweden took the bronze medal while France and Italy tied for fourth place. Rickie Fowler had the best 72-hole aggregate of 280, 10 under par.

The 2008 Espirito Santo Trophy was played at The Grange Golf Club one week prior.

Teams
65 teams contested the event. Each team had three played with the exception of Bolivia, Guatemala and Honduras who only has two.

The following table lists the players on the leading teams.

Results

Source:

Individual leaders
There was no official recognition for the lowest individual scores.

Source:

References

External links
Record Book on International Golf Federation website

Eisenhower Trophy
Golf tournaments in Australia
Eisenhower Trophy
Eisenhower Trophy
Eisenhower Trophy